Spellacy may refer to:
Frank Spellacy (born  1901), American football player
James Spellacy, English footballer
Thomas J. Spellacy (1880–1957), an American political leader and lawyer